Out of the Dark is a 1989 American slasher film starring Karen Witter. The film is notable for being the last acting credit of the drag queen Divine, who died slightly over a year before its release.

Plot
"Suite Nothings" is a sleazy L.A. phone-sex hot-line voiced by failed models.  Preying on them is Bobo, a psychotic killer who dresses in a clown costume.  While the police try to uncover the clown's identity, the agency's models fall to Bobo's murderous rage.

Cast
Karen Black as Ruth Wilson
Bud Cort as Doug Stringer
Geoffrey Lewis as Dennis
Tracey Walter as Lt. Frank Meyers
Divine as Det. Langella
Cameron Dye as Kevin Silvers
Lainie Kazan as Hooker Nancy
Karen Witter as Jo Ann
Karen Mayo-Chandler as Barbara
Tab Hunter as Driver
Paul Bartel as Hotel Clerk
Silvana Gallardo as McDonald

Release

The movie was shown in October 1992 on the UK's TalkingPictures TV Channel as part of its "Cellar Club" line up of off the beaten track vintage movies.

Home media

Out of the Dark was released on VHS and Laserdisc in 1989 by RCA/Columbia Pictures home video.  Sony Pictures released the film on a manufactured-on-demand DVD-R of the film on March 1, 2011.

Mill Creek Entertainment re-released Out of the Dark on DVD.

Reception

Stephen Holden from the New York Times gave the film a negative review, calling it "misogynistic" and criticized its inconsistent tone. Time Out called it "A straight re-run of those '70s slasher pics", and criticized the film for the obvious identity of the killer. TV Guide awarded the film one out of four stars, stating that the only real selling point was the "eccentric array of supporting players".

References

External links 

1989 horror films
American slasher films
American serial killer films
Horror films about clowns
CineTel Films films
1980s English-language films
Films directed by Michael Schroeder
1980s American films